The 1960 Wyoming Cowboys football team was an American football team that represented the University of Wyoming as a member of the 1960 NCAA University Division football season. The Cowboys offense scored 212 points while the defense allowed 71 points. In their fourth year under head coach Bob Devaney, the Cowboys finished the season with eight wins and two losses. Running back Jerry Hill was in his final season and finished his collegiate career with 1,374 rushing yards on 288 carries.

Schedule

Awards and honors
Jerry Hill, All-Skyline Conference Running Back

1960 Team Players in the NFL
The following were selected in the 1961 NFL Draft.

References

Wyoming
Wyoming Cowboys football seasons
Mountain States Conference football champion seasons
Wyoming Cowboys football